Randeep Singh Nabha also known as Kaka Randeep Singh Nabha is an Indian politician and a leader of Indian National Congress. He is serving as Agriculture Minister in the Punjab Government. He is a MLA in Punjab Vidhan Sabha and represents Amloh 2012–2017.He is married to Behista who hails from Royal family of Afghanistan.

References 

Punjab, India MLAs 2012–2017
Living people
Year of birth missing (living people)
Punjab, India MLAs 2017–2022
Indian National Congress politicians from Punjab, India